Valea Ciorii is a commune located in Ialomița County, Muntenia, Romania. It is composed of four villages: Bucșa, Dumitrești, Murgeanca and Valea Ciorii.

References

Communes in Ialomița County
Localities in Muntenia